Toe walking refers to a condition where a person walks on their toes without putting much or any weight on the heel or any other part of the foot. This term also includes the inability to connect one's foot fully to the ground while in the standing phase of the walking cycle. Toe walking in toddlers is common. Children who toe walk as toddlers commonly adopt a heel-toe walking pattern as they grow older. If a child continues to walk on their toes past the age of three, or can't get their heels to the ground at all, they should be evaluated by a health professional who is experienced in assessing children's walking.

Toe walking can be caused by a number of health conditions. When there is no medical reason for toe walking and no underlying condition can be identified, health professionals will commonly refer to it as "idiopathic" toe walking. This is not a formal or recognized diagnosis; rather, it is simply a term indicating that there is no identifiable reason or causal factor for the toe walking. Idiopathic toe walking should only be considered after all other conditions have been excluded.  Other causes for toe walking include a congenital short Achilles tendon, muscle spasticity (commonly associated with cerebral palsy) or genetic diseases muscle disease such as Duchenne muscular dystrophy. Toe walking may also be caused by a bone block located at the ankle which prevents the ankle from moving. This may be as the result of trauma or arthritis. Toe walking may also be one way of accommodating a separate condition, foot drop. Persistent toe walking in children has been identified as a potential early sign of autism. Toe walking is commonly found in children who have been placed on the autism spectrum. In a recent study, 68% of children on the autism spectrum report experiencing a walking abnormality.

It is estimated that 5% of healthy children have no reason for their toe walking (idiopathic toe walking). Idiopathic toe walking has also been observed  more in males than females when very large groups of children with toe walking are observed.  One study looked for a family history of toe walking, and found a connection with family members all toe walking with no medical reason (idiopathic toe walking). This means there may be a genetic link with idiopathic toe walking.

Cause
Idiopathic toe walking is always bilateral and has no orthopedic or neurological cause. It is diagnosed after if it continues past the age of three. In this condition, children are able to voluntarily walk with the typical heel-toe pattern, but prefer to walk on their tip toes. In order for it to be considered idiopathic, the child's medical history should be clear of any neurological, orthopedic, or neuro-psychiatric conditions including other gait abnormalities. It is thought to be related to sensory processing challenges.
Two classifications of idiopathic toe walking have been established. The Alvarez's classification identifies the severity of the toe walking based upon kinematics and ankle rockers. The Pomarino classification identifies the toe walking according to the individual's specific characteristics and characterizes them into three types based on the signs presented.

Cerebral palsy
Studies have been performed to determine the source of the association between toe walking and cerebral palsy. One study suggests that the toe walking—sometimes called an equinus gait—associated with cerebral palsy presents with an abnormally short medial and lateral gastrocnemius and soleus—the primary muscles involved in plantarflexion. A separate study found that the gait could be a compensatory movement due to weakened plantarflexion muscles. In people who have cerebral palsy and toe walk, there is greater plantarflexion force required for normal heel-to-toe walking than for toe walking. When typically developing children are tasked to perform different types of toe walking, their toe walking could not reduce the force to the levels that children who toe walking with cerebral palsy have when they walk. This suggests that toe walking associated with cerebral palsy may be due to abnormally weakened plantarflexion that can only manage toe walking.

GLUT1 Deficiency Syndrome

Toe walking is a symptom in those with GLUT1 deficiency Syndrome.

Diagnosis

There are many health professionals who assess and treat toe walking. Family physicians, neurologists, orthopaedic surgeons, pediatricians, physical therapists, physiotherapists and podiatrists are all commonly consulted. Treatment will depend on the cause of the condition.

Treatment
For idiopathic toe walking in young children, health professionals may prefer to watch and wait: as the child may "outgrow" the toe walking with time. There are limited treatments that demonstrate long term walking change. Many treatments instead focus on any tightness in the calf muscles that can be associated with the toe walking. 
Common treatments for idiopathic toe walking can include:
 Wearing a brace, splint or type of orthoses either during the day, night or both. The brace limits the ability of the child to walk on their toes and may stretch muscle and tendon at the back of the leg. One type of orthoses commonly used are an AFO (ankle-foot orthoses).
 Serial casting, where the leg is cast with the calf muscle stretched. The cast is changed weekly with progressive stretching. Sometimes, these casts are not be changed weekly and instead every 2–3 weeks.
 Botox therapy may be used to paralyze the calf muscles to reduce the opposite of the muscles to work harder. This may be used with serial casting or splinting, however, one small study has shown this has limited impact. 
 If conservative (non-surgical) measures do not help with changing the walking or making the calf muscles longer and correcting the toe walking after about 12–24 months, surgical lengthening of the tendon is an option. The surgery is typically done under full anaesthesia but if there are no issues, the child is released the same day. After the surgery, a below-the-knee walking cast is often worn for six weeks and then an AFO is worn to protect the tendon for several months.

For toe walking which results from other medical conditions, additional specialists may need to be consulted.

References

External links 

Foot diseases